Giuseppe de Rossi, O.F.M. Conv. (1610–1659) was a Roman Catholic prelate who served as Bishop of Umbriatico (1655–1659).

Biography
Giuseppe de Rossi was born in Naples, Italy and ordained a priest in the Order of Friars Minor Conventual.
On 9 July 1655, he was appointed during the papacy of Pope Alexander VII as Bishop of Umbriatico.
On 11 July 1655, he was consecrated bishop by Francesco Maria Brancaccio, Bishop of Viterbo e Tuscania. 
He served as Bishop of Umbriatico until his death in 1659.

References

External links and additional sources
 (for Chronology of Bishops) 
 (for Chronology of Bishops) 

17th-century Italian Roman Catholic bishops
Bishops appointed by Pope Alexander VII
1610 births
1659 deaths
Clergy from Naples
Conventual Franciscan bishops